Charles Hillyer (4 August 1845 – 4 October 1872) was an English cricketer. He played one first-class match for Kent in 1868.

References

External links
 

1845 births
1872 deaths
English cricketers
Kent cricketers
Sportspeople from Kent